Samuel Tuke (31 July 1784 – 14 October 1857) was a Quaker philanthropist and mental-health reformer. He was born in York, England.

Early life
Samuel was part of a Quaker family. He was the son of Henry Tuke and the grandson of William Tuke, who founded the York Retreat.

Career
He greatly advanced the cause of the amelioration of the condition of the insane, and devoted himself largely to the York Retreat. The methods of treatment pursued there were made more widely known by his Description of the Retreat near York. In this work Samuel Tuke referred to the Retreat's methods as moral treatment, borrowed from the French "traitement moral" being used to describe the work of Jean-Baptiste Pussin and Philippe Pinel in France (and in the original French referring more to morale in the sense of the emotions and self-esteem, rather than rights and wrongs). 

Samuel Tuke also published Practical Hints on the Construction and Economy of Pauper Lunatic Asylums (1815).

Personal life
He married Priscilla Hack, the daughter of James Hack of Chichester and Hannah Jeffreys. Their children were:

 James Hack Tuke (1819–1896), also active in humanitarian concerns
 Elizabeth Tuke (1821-1890), also active in humanitarian concerns, married William Stacey Gibson in 1845
 William Murray Tuke (1822–1903), tea merchant and banker
 Daniel Hack Tuke (1827–1895), also active in humanitarian concerns

Legacy
The Retreat still provides mental healthcare for the population of York and the wider community. Samuel Tuke is buried in the Quaker cemetery within the hospital grounds. In August 2017 York Civic Trust commemorated him with a blue plaque.

References

1784 births
1857 deaths
English Quakers
People educated at Ackworth School
Samuel
People from York
Mental health activists